The One I Love may refer to:

 The One I Love (Belongs to Somebody Else), a 1920s song
 "The One I Love" (Allan Jones song), a song from the 1938 movie Everybody Sing
 "Dedicated to the One I Love", a 1957 song by The Shirelles
 "The One I Love" (R.E.M. song), a 1987 song and a top ten hit in the US.
 "The One I Love" (David Gray song), a 2005 song and a top ten hit in the UK.
 The One I Love (manga), a manga series by Clamp
 The One I Love (film), a 2014 American film
"The One I Love", a 2014 song by Blonde Redhead from Barragán
 "One I Love", a 2002 song by Coldplay and the B-side of the single "In My Place"

fr:Celui que j'aime